Shippensburg University of Pennsylvania (Ship or SU) is a public university in Shippensburg, Pennsylvania. It is part of the Pennsylvania State System of Higher Education. Founded in 1871, it later became the first teachers college in Pennsylvania. Shippensburg University is accredited by the Middle States Commission on Higher Education.

History

The commonwealth legislated the State Normal School for "the education and training of teachers" in the seventh district (seven counties) to be in Shippensburg, and in 1871 the cornerstone was laid for the  building designated the Cumberland Valley State Normal School. In 1917 the school was purchased by the Commonwealth of Pennsylvania.

On June 4, 1926, the school was authorized to grant the Bachelor of Science in education degree in elementary and junior high education. The school received a charter on October 12, 1926, making it the first normal school in Pennsylvania to become a state teachers college. On June 3, 1927, the State Council of Education authorized the school to change its name to the State Teachers College at Shippensburg.

The business education curriculum was approved on December 3, 1937. On December 8, 1939, Shippensburg State Teachers College became the first teachers college in Pennsylvania and the fourth in the United States to be accredited by the Middle States Association of colleges and (Secondary) Schools.

The State Council of Education approved graduate work leading to the Master of Education degree on January 7, 1959. On January 8, 1960, the name change to Shippensburg State College was authorized.

The arts and sciences curriculum was authorized by the State Council of Education on April 18, 1962, and the Bachelor of Science in business administration degree program was initiated on September 1, 1967.

On November 12, 1982, the governor of the Commonwealth signed Senate Bill 506 establishing the State System of Higher Education. Shippensburg State College was designated Shippensburg University of Pennsylvania effective July 1, 1983.

Since 1985, many of the original historic buildings of the campus, including Old Main, are listed in the National Register of Historic Places.

Academics

Shippensburg University offers more than 100 undergraduate programs in the College of Arts and Sciences, the College of Education and Human Services, and the John L. Grove College of Business. It also offers more than 50 master's degree programs, two doctoral programs, and three post-bachelor or post-master's certificate programs in 17 fields of study in the School of Graduate Studies. The university is accredited by Middle States Commission on Higher Education and specific degree programs are accredited by AACSB International, ABET, Academy of Criminal Justice Sciences, Accrediting Council on Education in Journalism and Mass Communications, American Chemical Society, Council on Social Work Education, Council for the Accreditation of Counseling and Related Educational Programs, International Association of Counseling Services, National Council for the Accreditation of Teachers, and Council for Exceptional Children.

Schools and colleges
College of Arts and Sciences
College of Education and Human Services
John L. Grove College of Business
Elnetta G. Jones University Center for Student Success and Exploratory Studies
Milton and Doreen Morgan School of Engineering
School of Graduate Studies
Wood Honors College

The Office of Workforce Development also offers a variety of courses, workshops, training sessions, continuing education, and credit and non-credit courses.

Rankings
For the 2022–2023 academic year, out of 181 colleges in the Regional Universities North division, U.S. News & World Report ranked Shippensburg University as tied for 101st overall, tied for 150th
in Top Performers on Social Mobility, and tied for 33rd place in Top Public Schools.

Library

The Ezra Lehman Memorial Library provides digital access to its holdings, the holdings of the State Library of Pennsylvania and 24 other academic libraries, a variety of full-text databases, electronic books, and Internet sites. The library collection includes over two million items, including bound volumes, microfilm pieces, periodicals, audiovisual titles, government documents, and The Shippensburg University Archives. The Information and Computing Technologies Center maintains a campus network with a number of computer labs for student use. Each student at SU receives an email account and access to the Internet.

Athletics

Shippensburg University is an NCAA Division II school and one of eighteen schools to compete in the Pennsylvania State Athletic Conference (PSAC). The school maintains intercollegiate programs for baseball, basketball (Men & Women), cross country (Men & Women), field hockey, football, lacrosse (Women), soccer (Men & Women), softball, track and field (Men & Women), swimming (Men & Women), tennis (Women), volleyball (Women) and wrestling. Several club sports, such as rugby (Men & Women), Ultimate Frisbee and the inline hockey team, also participate in independent leagues. The home venue of the university's football and track & field programs is Seth Grove Stadium. The team name is the Raiders, and the mascot is "Big Red," a red-tail hawk wearing a pirates hat. The team colors are blue and red.

Notable alumni

Demographics

Shippensburg University CDP is a census-designated place located in Shippensburg Township, Cumberland County, in the U.S. state of Pennsylvania. It is located just north of the borough of Shippensburg and covers the campus of Shippensburg University of Pennsylvania. It was first listed as a CDP in 2010. As of the 2010 census the population of the CDP was 2,625.

References

External links

Shippensburg University Athletics

 
Eastern Pennsylvania Rugby Union
Educational institutions established in 1871
Universities and colleges in Cumberland County, Pennsylvania
Universities and colleges in Franklin County, Pennsylvania
School buildings on the National Register of Historic Places in Pennsylvania
1871 establishments in Pennsylvania
Historic districts on the National Register of Historic Places in Pennsylvania
National Register of Historic Places in Franklin County, Pennsylvania
Public universities and colleges in Pennsylvania